William Bertalan Walsh, M.D. (April 26, 1920 – December 27, 1996) was the founder of Project HOPE (USA).

Walsh was born on April 26, 1920, in Brooklyn. He received a bachelor's degree from St. John's University in Queens, New York. He graduated from medical school at Georgetown University in 1943.

He served as a ship's doctor aboard a destroyer during World War II. He was the first U.S. physician on the ground in Hiroshima, after the atomic bomb was dropped. He was moved by the poor health conditions he saw in the South Pacific. He envisioned a floating, non-military medical center that would bring health education and improved care to people around the world and established Project HOPE.

In 1958, Walsh persuaded President Eisenhower to donate a U.S. Navy hospital ship. Within two years, the ship was transformed into the SS Hope.

On September 22, 1960, Hope set sail from San Francisco bound for Indonesia. The S.S. HOPE eventually completed 11 voyages traveling to Indonesia, Vietnam, Peru, Ecuador, Guinea, Nicaragua, Colombia, Ceylon (Sri Lanka), Tunisia, Jamaica, and Brazil. The ship was retired in 1974.

On June 23, 1987, Walsh was presented with the Presidential Medal of Freedom by President Ronald Reagan.
 
Walsh died at his home in Bethesda, Maryland of prostate cancer in 1996 at the age of 76.

Bibliography

Sources
Novelguide
Project HOPE

References

External links
William B. Walsh, M. D. (1920-1996)

1920 births
1996 deaths
Deaths from prostate cancer
People from Brooklyn
United States Navy Medical Corps officers
Georgetown University School of Medicine alumni
Laetare Medal recipients
Presidential Medal of Freedom recipients
United States Navy personnel of World War II